{{Infobox magazine
|title          =  
|image_file     = RTÉ Guide.jpg 
|image_size     = 200px 
|image_alt      = Cover of the RTÉ Guide from 20 June 2009
|image_caption  =  The RTÉ Guide on 20 June 2009|frequency      = Weekly 
|category       = TV and radio listings magazine 
|company        = RTÉ Commercial Enterprises Ltd  
|firstdate      = 1 December 1961 
|language       = EnglishIrish
|country        = Ireland 
|website        = http://www.rte.ie/rteguide/ 
|issn           = }}

The RTÉ Guide is a television and radio listings magazine in Ireland published by RTÉ Commercial Enterprises Ltd, a subsidiary of Raidió Teilifís Éireann (RTÉ).

The magazine offers detailed programme listings for RTÉ channels, as well as Virgin Media One, TG4, Virgin Media Two, BBC One, BBC Two, UTV, and Channel 4, as well as less detailed listings for variations of BBC Wales, ITV Wales, S4C and a number of satellite and cable channels. RTÉ Radio programme listings are also published. Lifestyle and celebrity articles are also included in the magazine.

History and profile
The RTÉ Guide began publication on 1 December 1961 as the RTV Guide and changed its name to the current name on 8 July 1966.

From 8 January 1977, the RTÉ Guide switched from tabloid format to a compact magazine size and also changed from monochrome into colour. Initially, listings were carried for Radio Luxembourg, AFN and BBC Northern Ireland but these were later dropped after a few years and only RTÉ programme listings were carried. After United Kingdom listings magazines such as Radio Times and TV Times were deregulated from 1 March 1991, the magazine began carrying BBC, UTV/HTV Wales and Channel 4, (with S4C) listings also from 13 April 1991.

A special Christmas double issue of RTÉ Guide is published every year to cover the Christmas and New Year period.

In April 2018, the design of the RTÉ Guide was changed for the first time in a number of years.

On 19 May 2019, it was reported that RTÉ was considering selling the RTÉ Guide. On 16 June 2019, it was reported that the Sunday Business Post owner, Enda O’Coineen, might acquire the RTÉ Guide. However by 5 December 2019, RTÉ had abandoned the proposed sale.

Circulation
The Audit Bureau of Circulations circulation figures for the RTÉ Guide were:

 130,327 for July 2002 to December 2002
 118,263 for July 2003 to December 2003
 102,795 for the first six months in 2006
 61,881 for 2012 
 53,695 in 2014 
 51,413 for 2015 
 48,089 for 2016 
 45,861 for 2017 
 43,195 for 2018

Figures subsequent to 2018 are not available because the RTÉ Guide'' is no longer registered with the Audit Bureau of Circulations.

See also
 Television in the Republic of Ireland
 Radio in the Republic of Ireland

References

External links
 RTÉ Guide Online

Magazines published in Ireland
Listings magazines
Magazines established in 1961
1961 establishments in Ireland
Guide
Guide
Television magazines
Weekly magazines published in Ireland